Learning by doing refers to a theory of education. This theory has been expounded by American philosopher John Dewey and Latinamerican pedagogue Paulo Freire. It is a hands-on approach to learning, meaning students must interact with their environment in order to adapt and learn. Freire highlighted the important role of the individual development seeking to generate awareness and nurture critical skills. Dewey implemented this idea by setting up the University of Chicago Laboratory School. His views have been important in establishing practices of progressive education. For instance, the learn-by-doing theory was adopted by Richard DuFour and applied to the development of professional learning communities.

Dewey expanded upon these principles in Democracy and Education.

The phrase "Learn by Doing" is the motto and instructional pedagogy of California Polytechnic State University, San Luis Obispo.

See also
4-H
Active learning
Experiential learning
Project-based learning
Procedural knowledge
Trial and error
Vocational education

References

Education theory